Francis Mostyn may refer to:

 Francis Mostyn (archbishop of Cardiff) (1860–1939), Roman Catholic prelate
 Francis Mostyn (Vicar Apostolic of the Northern District) (1800–1847), Roman Catholic prelate